Nonlinear medium may refer to:

 A material with nonlinear elasticity
 An optical medium that obeys nonlinear optics

See also
Linear medium (disambiguation)